Autheuil-en-Valois is a commune in the Oise department in northern France.

Population

See also
Communes of the Oise department

References

Communes of Oise